The Berezinskii–Kosterlitz–Thouless transition (BKT transition) is a phase transition of the two-dimensional (2-D) XY model in statistical physics. It is a transition from bound vortex-antivortex pairs at low temperatures to unpaired vortices and anti-vortices at some critical temperature. The transition is named for condensed matter physicists Vadim Berezinskii, John M. Kosterlitz and David J. Thouless.  BKT transitions can be found in several 2-D systems in condensed matter physics that are approximated by the XY model, including Josephson junction arrays and thin disordered superconducting granular films. More recently, the term has been applied by the 2-D superconductor insulator transition community to the pinning of Cooper pairs in the insulating regime, due to similarities with the original vortex BKT transition.

Work on the transition led to the 2016 Nobel Prize in Physics being awarded to Thouless and Kosterlitz; Berezinskii died in 1980.

XY model
The XY model is a two-dimensional vector spin model that possesses U(1) or circular symmetry. This system is not expected to possess a normal second-order phase transition. This is because the expected ordered phase of the system is destroyed by transverse fluctuations, i.e. the Nambu-Goldstone modes associated with this broken continuous symmetry, which logarithmically diverge with system size.
This is a specific case of what is called the Mermin–Wagner theorem in spin systems.

Disordered phases with different correlations
In the XY model in two dimensions, a second-order phase transition is not seen. However, one finds a low-temperature quasi-ordered phase with a correlation function (see statistical mechanics) that decreases with the distance like a power, which depends on the temperature. The transition from the high-temperature disordered phase with the exponential correlation to this low-temperature quasi-ordered phase is a Kosterlitz–Thouless transition.
It is a phase transition of infinite order.

Role of vortices
In the 2-D XY model, vortices are topologically stable configurations. It is found that the high-temperature disordered phase with exponential correlation decay is a result of the formation of vortices. Vortex generation becomes thermodynamically favorable at the critical temperature  of the Kosterlitz–Thouless transition. At temperatures below this, vortex generation has a power law correlation.

Kosterlitz–Thouless transitions is described as a dissociation of bound  vortex pairs with opposite circulations, called vortex–antivortex pairs, first described by Vadim Berezinskii. In these systems, thermal generation of vortices produces an even number of vortices of opposite sign. Bound vortex–antivortex pairs have lower energies than free vortices, but have lower entropy as well. In order to minimize free energy, the system undergoes a transition at a critical temperature, . Below , there are only bound vortex–antivortex pairs. Above , there are free vortices.

Informal description
There is an elegant thermodynamic argument for the Kosterlitz–Thouless transition. One assumes . Thus, the Helmholtz free energy is

When , the system will not have a vortex. On the other hand, when , entropic considerations favor the formation of a vortex. The critical temperature above which vortices may form can be found by setting  and is given by

The  Kosterlitz–Thouless transition can be observed experimentally in systems like 2D Josephson junction arrays by taking current and voltage (I-V) measurements. Above , the relation will be linear . This jump from linear dependence is indicative of a  Kosterlitz–Thouless transition and may be used to determine . This approach was used in Resnick et al. to confirm the  Kosterlitz–Thouless transition in proximity-coupled Josephson junction arrays.

Field theoretic analysis 
The following discussion uses field theoretic methods. For convenience, we work with the universal cover R of  instead, but identify any two values of φ(x) that differ by an integer multiple of 2π.

The energy is given by

Taking a contour integral  over any contractible closed path , we would expect it to be zero. However, this is not the case due to the singular nature of vortices. We can imagine that the theory is defined up to some energetic cut-off scale , so that we can puncture the plane at the points where the vortices are located, by removing regions of linear size of order . The value of this integer is the index of the vector field . Suppose that a given field configuration has  punctures located at  each with index . The complex argument function has a branch cut, but, because  is defined modulo , it has no physical consequences.

Now,

If , the second term is positive and diverges in the limit : configurations with unbalanced numbers of vortices of each orientation are never energetically favoured.
The scale L is an arbitrary scale that renders the argument of the logarithm dimensionless.

Assume the case with only vortices of multiplicity . At low temperatures and large  the distance between a vortex and antivortex pair tends to be extremely small, essentially of the order . At large temperatures and small  this distance increases, and the favoured configuration becomes effectively the one of a gas of free vortices and antivortices. The transition between the two different configurations is the Kosterlitz–Thouless phase transition.

See also
 KTHNY theory
 Goldstone boson
 Ising model
 Lambda transition
 Potts model
 Quantum vortex
 Superfluid film
 Hexatic phase
 Topological defect

Notes

References 
 . Translation available: 
 . Translation available: 
 
 
 B. I. Halperin, D. R. Nelson, Phys. Rev. Lett. 41, 121 (1978)
 A. P. Young, Phys. Rev. B 19, 1855 (1979)

Books 
 J.V. Jose, 40 Years of Berezinskii–Kosterlitz–Thouless Theory, World Scientific, 2013, 
 H. Kleinert, Gauge Fields in Condensed Matter, Vol. I, " SUPERFLOW AND VORTEX LINES", pp. 1–742, World Scientific (Singapore, 1989); Paperback   (also available online: Vol. I. Read pp. 618–688);
 H. Kleinert, Multivalued Fields in Condensed Matter, Electrodynamics, and Gravitation'', World Scientific (Singapore, 2008) (also available online: here)

Theoretical physics
Statistical mechanics
Lattice models
Phase transitions